The third season of Australian reality television series House Rules, also known as House Rules 2015, was confirmed in 2014 and began airing on 5 May 2015. The series was produced by the team who created the Seven reality show My Kitchen Rules and was hosted by Johanna Griggs.

This season of House Rules places six new teams renovating each other's homes and further challenges for the ultimate prize of a full mortgage payment.

Contestant Teams

This season of House Rules introduced six new teams. All teams are from different states in Australia.

Elimination history

Competition details

Phase 1: Interior Renovation
The six teams travel around the country to completely renovate each other's home. Every week, one team hands over their house to their opponents for a complete interior transformation. A set of rules from the owners are given to the teams known as the 'House rules' which need to be followed to gain high scores from the judges and the homeowner team.

Victoria: Bronik & Corrine
 Episodes 1 to 4
 Airdate — 5 to 10 May 2015
 Description — Bronik and Corrine from Melbourne, Victoria are the first team to hand over their keys for renovation. For the first time, unlike the normal five House Rules in previous seasons, both Bronik and Corinne each had their own set of three 'His and Hers' House Rules, which meant that teams had to work with two sets of rules that conflicted with each other.

South Australia: Ryan & Marlee
 Episodes 5 to 8
 Airdate — 11 to 17 May 2015
 Description — Teams head to Ryan and Marlee's home in Adelaide, South Australia for the second renovation. Teams had to allocate the five zones amongst themselves as an additional twist. 
Previous winner's advantage: Karina and Brian — A secret house rule which they could choose keep secret or share with the others.
Previous loser's disadvantage: Cassie and Matt — Camping in a tent during the renovation.

New South Wales: Steve & Tiana
 Episodes 9 to 12
 Airdate — 18 to 24 May 2015
 Description — Teams head to Sydney, New South Wales to completely renovate Steve and Tiana's family home. Two of the bedrooms belong to Steve's sons; 23 year old, Andrew and 5 year old, Rory.
Previous winner's advantage: Cassie and Matt — Allocating the zones for themselves and all other teams.
Previous loser's disadvantage: Bronik and Corrine — Although Steve and Tiana were the lowest scoring team in the previous week, they do not participate in the renovation of their own home, therefore the loser's tent was given to the second-lowest scorer.

Queensland: Ben & Danielle
 Episodes 13 to 16
 Airdate — 25 to 31 May 2015
 Description — Teams head to Brisbane, Queensland the transform Ben and Danielle's old brick home and is the first home so far to feature a second storey area. It also happened to have been filmed during the 2014 Brisbane hailstorm.
Previous winner's advantage: Ben and Danielle — As the winners from last week and the owners of this week's house, their advantage was to give each room a special item which teams must use within the design of the room.
Previous loser's disadvantage: Karina and Brian — For coming last, they are given the loser's tent, camping in the yard for the duration of the renovation.

Tasmania: Cassie & Matt
 Episodes 17 to 20
 Airdate — 1 to 7 June 2015
 Description — The teams head to Hobart, Tasmania for a retro revival as Cassie & Matt ask their competitors to merge the old with the new. As an additional challenge, every team must also incorporate an up-cycled feature in their zones that fits with the house rules.
Previous winner's advantage: Cassie & Matt  — As the owners of this house, they gave each team a special item that must be used within their zones. 
Previous loser's disadvantage:  Steve & Tiana — Camping in the loser's tent for the duration of the renovation.

Western Australia: Karina & Brian
 Episodes 21 to 24
 Airdate — 8 to 14 June 2015
 Description — Teams headed to Karina and Brian's home in Geraldton, Western Australia for the final interior renovation. Being in such a remote location, teams had only limited time to purchase items from Perth. Karina and Brian's children also had their bedrooms renovated, for 6-year-old Lara, 15-year-old Bailey and 16-year-old Daniel. It was anticipated that the lowest scoring team overall was to be eliminated, however in a pre-determined twist, all teams remained safe and progressed into the next round.
Previous winner's advantage: Ben & Danielle — They were able to decide whether to sleep in a hotel room or join the other teams in the tents.
Previous loser's disadvantage: All teams — All other teams slept in tents this week as part of them being in the outback to have the experience. Karina and Brian were the lowest scoring team from last week.

24 Hour Fix-Up

 Episodes 25 to 26
 Airdate — 15 to 16 June 2015
 Description — After the first six full house interior renovations, all teams head back to their own homes and must fix and redo one of the zones in 24 hours. Teams need to recreate the space/s to reflect their own style and also to impress the judges. All teams received the same set of five rules for the challenge. Scores are added to the current totals, where the lowest scoring team overall is eliminated. The winning team also received 5 extra points to their final tally.
Previous winner's advantage: Bronik & Corrine — As last week's winners, they received an additional $1000 to their budget

Phase 2: Holiday House

 Episodes 27 to 30
 Airdate — 21 to 28 June 2015
 Description — In the biggest challenge in House Rules history, the five remaining teams renovate a disconnected run-down old house into the Ultimate dream holiday home which will be won through a home viewer competition. The house was transported and permanently placed on a block of land in Hervey Bay, Queensland. Each team was allocated an interior and exterior zone to complete, which include gardens and surrounding yard areas. At the end of the challenge, the lowest scoring team is eliminated.
Previous winner's advantage: Cassie & Matt — For coming first in the previous interior renovation phase, they were able to choose the zone they wanted.

Phase 3: Gardens & Exteriors

The top 4 teams are challenged to transform the exteriors and gardens of each other's homes. Two teams are allocated to a home (that do not belong to them) and must renovate either the front or back yards, as well as improving the house exterior. They are held over two rounds, covering all houses of the current teams. After both rounds are complete, the lowest scoring team is eliminated.

Round 1

 Episodes 31 to 32
 Airdate —  29 to 30 June 2015
 Description — In round 1 of the exterior renovations, the 4 remaining teams head to Brisbane and Sydney to transform the gardens and house exterior in 3 and a half days. Teams are allocated to the front or back yard of either Ben & Danielle's or Steve & Tiana's house.

Round 2

 Episodes 33 to 34
 Airdate — 5 to 6 July 2015
 Description — The teams continue on to round 2 of the exterior renovations in Adelaide and Melbourne to transform the gardens and house exterior in 3 and a half days. Teams are allocated to the front or back yard of either Ryan & Marlee's or Bronik & Corrine's house. At the end of this round, the lowest scoring team will be eliminated.

Phase 4: CareSouth Charity House

 Episodes 35 to 38
 Airdate — 7 to 14 July 2015
 Description — The 3 remaining teams renovate a charity home for CareSouth who provide a safe place for children to live in. Zones were selected by choosing one of three random cards and each cover bedrooms, bathrooms and other living spaces. After one more team is eliminated, the top 2 advance into the live Grand Final.
Previous winner's advantage: Bronik & Corrine — For coming first in the Exteriors round, they were the first to choose their zone from the cards.

Grand Final: Secret Room and Australia's Vote

 Episode 39
 Airdate — 20 July 2015
 Description — The final 2 teams complete one final challenge at their opponent's home, to renovate the garage into a new space and entertainment area. The Australian public vote for their favourite team to win and the winner is decided by a combination of the judges score, for the final project and overall viewer votes. The team with the best result win a complete mortgage payment and is announced live. In addition, the winning viewer of the completed Holiday House is also announced.

 Note:
 This result is a combination of 50% from the public vote and 50% from the judge's scores for the Secret Room

Ratings
 Colour key:
  – Highest rating during the season
  – Lowest rating during the season

Ratings data used is from OzTAM and represents the live and same day average viewership from the 5 largest Australian metropolitan centres (Sydney, Melbourne, Brisbane, Perth and Adelaide).

Notes
Melbourne, Adelaide & Perth only
Sydney & Brisbane only

References

2015 Australian television seasons